Nishikant Dixit is an Indian film and television actor. He played the role of Rajaram in the television serial Maayke Se Bandhi Dor that aired on Indian television channel STAR Plus and the role of Kamlakar Tripathi in the television serial Chintu Chinki Aur Ek Badi Si Love Story that aired on SAB TV. He also worked in commercials.

He is married to Anjana Dixit and has two daughters named Aastha and Avika.

Filmography

Television
Maayke Se Bandhi Dor - Rajaram Mama
Crime Patrol - Various Characters
Chintu Chinki Aur Ek Badi Si Love Story - Kamlakar Tripathi (Chinki's Father)
Dil Se Di Dua... Saubhagyavati Bhava? - Rajiv Kumar Awasthi (Jhanvi's Uncle)
Udaan - Principal 
Piya Rangrezz - Mukand Mishra
Ishq Ka Rang Safed - Shambhu Tripathi
Jaat Ki Jugni
Ishq Subhan Allah - Khalid Miya
Pavitra Rishta-Chadda

References

External links

20th-century Indian male actors
1970 births
Living people
Male actors from Uttar Pradesh
People from Ghaziabad, Uttar Pradesh